The following is a list of notable people assassinated by the People's Mujahedin of Iran.

Islamic Republic targets

Heads of government branches 
 Mohammad-Ali Rajai (30 August 1981) – President of Iran
 Mohammad-Javad Bahonar (30 August 1981) – Prime Minister of Iran

Members of Parliament 
 Reza Kamyab (28 July 1981) – Mashhad
 Mojtaba Ozbaki (23 December 1981) – Shahrekord
 Mohammad-Taqi Besharat (28 December 1981) – Semirom
 Mojtaba Esteki (21 January 1982) – MP

Military and police officers 
 Brigadier General Saeed Taheri (13 August 1972) – Chief of Police of Tehran
 Brigadier General Reza Zandipoor (29 March 1975) – Chief of Anti-sabotage Joint Committee Prison
 Seyyed Naser Mohsenpur  (24 August 1981) – Islamic Revolutionary Guard Corps servicemen
General Zandipour (March 1975) – a warden assassinated at the Anti-sabotage Joint Committee prison

Other officials 
 Iranian employee at Embassy of the United States, Tehran (3 July 1975) 
 Majid Sharif Vaghefi (5 May 1975) – Part of a purge, central cadre member, he was shot dead by fellow MEK members and his body was burnt in order not to be identified.
 Malek Boroujerdi (23 December 1978) – Iranian Oilfield Services Company (IOSC) employee
 Mohammad-Ali Ansari (6 July 1981) – Governor of Gilan Province
 Ali Qoddousi (5 September 1981) – Military prosecutor-general
 Mir Asadollah Madani (11 September 1981) – Supreme leader's representative in East Azerbaijan Province
 Hassan Ayat (5 August 1981) - Iranian politician, member of Parliament of Iran in first assembly after the Iranian Revolution, member of Assembly of Experts for Constitution
 Abdol Hossein Dastgheib (11 December 1981) – Supreme leader's representative in Fars Province, he and several others killed in a suicide attack in Shiraz during Friday prayers
 Gholamali Jaaffarzadeh (23 December 1981) – Governor of Mashhad County
 Mohammad-Salim Hosni (14 March 1982) – Reconstruction Crusade official
 Ali-Mohammad Sadduqi (2 July 1982) – Supreme leader's representative in Yazd Province
 Assassination of a senior cleric in Tehran  (26 February 1982)
 Ata'ollah Ashrafi Esfahani (15 October 1982) – Supreme leader's representative in Kermanshah Province
 Hussein Ghane-Ghole (6 January 1987) – Warden of Mashhad prison
 Jamshid Ghare-Sarvari (13 February 1987) – Warden of Ahvaz prison
 Asadollah Lajevardi (23 August 1998) – Former warden of Evin Prison
A senior cleric (June 1998) assassinated in Najaf, Iraq 
A senior IRGC commander (1 May 2000) assassinated in Tehran

Lebanese citizens 
 Musa Shaib (28 July 1980) – A leading member of the Iraqi Ba'ath Party in Lebanon by using automatic firearm

Turkish citizens 
 Çağlar Yücel (12 December 1993) – A diplomat at the embassy of Turkey in Iraq

Attempted Islamic Republic targets

Heads of government branches 
 Ali Khamenei (15 March 1985) – President of Iran
 Mohammad Khatami (5 February 2000) – President of Iran

Members of Parliament 
 Habibollah Asgaroladi (20 July 1981) – Tehran
 Hadi Khamenei (11 February 1987) – Mashhad

Military and police officers 
 Brigadier General Mohsen Rafighdoost (14 September 1998) – Head of Mostazafan Foundation
 Major General Yahya Rahim Safavi (13 March 2000) – Commander-in-Chief of the Islamic Revolutionary Guard Corps
 Brigadier General Mohammad Baqer Ghalibaf (7 January 2001) – Chief of Police of Iran

Other officials 
 Ahmad Khomeini (15 June 1982) – Eldest son of the Supreme leader
 Mohammad Va'ez Abaee-Khorasani (22 April 1994) – Member of the Assembly of Experts from Khorasan Province
 Mohammed Raisi (6 July 1997) – Diplomat at Iranian Embassy in Madrid, Spain
 Ali Razini (5 January 1999) – Head of Tehran's judiciary

Attempted American targets 

 Brigadier General Harold Price (May 1972)

Islamic Republic of Iran assassinations allegations against the MEK 
 Seyyed Hasan Beheshti (23 July 1981) – Islamic Republican Party's candidate for the parliamentary elections
 Mousa Kalantari (28 June 1981) – Minister of Housing
 Abdulkarim Hasheminejad (29 September 1981) – Mashhad
 Major General Ali Sayyad Shirazi (10 April 1999) – Deputy Chief of the General Staff of Iranian Armed Forces
 Mohammad Kachui (29 June 1981) – Warden of Evin Prison
 Mahmoud Ghandi (28 June 1981) – Minister of Post, Telegraph and Telephone
 Hassan Abbaspour (28 June 1981) – Minister of Energy
 Mohammad-Ali Fayyazbakhsh (28 June 1981) – Minister without portfolio
 Colonel Houshang Vahid-Dastjerdi (5 September 1981) – Chief of Police of Iran
 Mohammad Montazeri (28 June 1981) – Najafabad
 Mohammad Chavoushi (8 March 1982) – Chief of the political and ideological office of the Islamic Republic of Iran Navy

Disputed Assassinations
 Gholam-Hussein Haghani (28 June 1981) – Bandar Abbas
 Fakhreddin Rahimi (28 June 1981) – Malavi
 Abbas-Ali Nateq-Nouri (28 June 1981) – Nour
 Mohammad Beheshti (28 June 1981) – Chief Justice of Iran
 Paul E. Grimm (killed 23 December 1978) – Iranian Oilfield Services Company (IOSC) employee
On  28 June 1981, a bomb detonated at the Islamic Republican Party headquarters in Tehran killed 73, including the party's secretary-general, 4 cabinet ministers, 10 vice ministers and 27 members of the Parliament of Iran. See Hafte Tir bombing
 Lieutenant colonel Lewis L. Hawkins (2 June 1973) – United States Army military adviser in Iran (the Washington Post reported that the leader of the group, Vahid Afrakhteh, one of the founders of Peykar, stated that he personally killed col. Lewis Lee Hawkins in Tehran in 1973.[p.A9]).
 Colonel Paul R. Shaffer (21 May 1975) – United States Air Force military adviser in Iran.
 Lieutenant colonel Jack H. Turner (21 May 1975) – United States Air Force military adviser in Iran
 Robert R. Krongrad, William C. Cottrell, Jr., Donald G. Smith (28 August 1976)  – they assassinated by four gunmen on their way to Doshan Tappeh Air Base to work on Project IBEX.

See also
Camp Ashraf

References 

People's Mujahedin of Iran
Iran